Manuel Pérez Cárdenas (born 30 November 1953) is a Mexican economist and politician affiliated with the National Action Party. As of 2014 he served as Deputy of the LIX Legislature of the Mexican Congress as a plurinominal representative.

References

1953 births
Living people
Mexican economists
Politicians from Tepic, Nayarit
Members of the Chamber of Deputies (Mexico)
National Action Party (Mexico) politicians
Deputies of the LIX Legislature of Mexico